Ada Charlotte Mackenzie (October 30, 1891 – January 25, 1973) was a Canadian golfer who founded the Ladies Golf Club of Toronto in 1924. In 1933, Mackenzie was the second athlete chosen as The Canadian Press outstanding female athlete of the year. She was inducted into numerous halls of fame including the Canada Sports Hall of Fame in 1955 and the Canadian Golf Hall of Fame in 1971.

Early life and education
Mackenzie was born on October 30, 1891 in Toronto, Ontario. She went to Havergal College from 1903 to 1911 and became interested in sports like her parents, who were golfers. At Havergal, Mackenzie played various sports including cricket and tennis and was the college's top athlete three years in a row.

Career
After completing her schooling at Havergal College in 1911, she remained at the college as an instructor until 1914. After leaving Havergal College, Mackenzie worked for the Canadian Bank of Commerce until 1930.

Golf career
In 1924, Mackenzie created the Ladies Golf Club of Toronto in response to the time restrictions she was given as a woman golfer. Later in 1930, she opened up a women's sportswear store after she felt that the women's golf apparel at that time was not appropriate.

On the golf course, Mackenzie competed in various golf tournaments throughout North America and Bermuda. Her first tournament win was at the Canadian Women's Amateur in 1919, which she won five times throughout her career. Outside of Canada, Mackenzie medalled at the U.S. Women's Amateur in 1927. Mackenzie's last golf tournament win was at the Ontario Senior Women's Amateur in 1969.

Awards and achievements
In 1933, Mackenzie was named the outstanding female athlete of the year by The Canadian Press. Mackenzie was inducted in the Canada Sports Hall of Fame in 1955 and both the Canadian Golf Hall of Fame and the Canadian Olympic Hall of Fame in 1971. After her death, Mackenzie was posthumously inducted into the Ontario Golf Hall of Fame in 2000 and the Ontario Sports Hall of Fame in 2003.

A park in Richmond Hill, Ontario is named after her.

Death
On January 25, 1973, Mackenzie died in Toronto, Ontario.

Amateur wins
1919 Canadian Women's Amateur
1925 Canadian Women's Amateur
1926 Canadian Women's Amateur, Canadian Ladies' Close Championship
1927 Canadian Ladies' Close Championship
1929 Canadian Ladies' Close Championship
1931 Canadian Ladies' Close Championship
1933 Canadian Women's Amateur, Canadian Ladies' Close Championship
1935 Canadian Women's Amateur
1937 Bermuda Tournament
1955 Canadian Senior Women's Championship
1958 Bercanus Tournament 
1960 Canadian Senior Women's Championship
1962 Canadian Senior Women's Championship
1965 Canadian Senior Women's Championship, Ontario Senior Women's Championship
1969 Ontario Senior Women's Championship

References

External links
 

Canadian female golfers
Amateur golfers
Golfers from Toronto
1891 births
1973 deaths